Richard  Anthony Sterban (born April 24, 1943) is an American singer. He was born in Camden, New Jersey. In 1973, he joined the country and gospel quartet The Oak Ridge Boys, in which he sings bass.

Personal life

Born in Camden, New Jersey, Sterban grew up in Collingswood, New Jersey, After graduating from Collingswood High School, Sterban attended Trenton State College (now The College of New Jersey).

Career

Prior to joining The Oak Ridge Boys, Sterban toured with J. D. Sumner and the Stamps Quartet, who were singing backup for Elvis Presley at that time. Sterban ultimately became best known for his "oom-pa-pa-oom-pa-pa-mow-mow" bass solo in the Oak Ridge Boys' 1981 single "Elvira" and sang lead vocals on a select few of the group's songs, including a cover of The Righteous Brothers' hit "Dream On", which was a top-ten hit.

Sterban has recorded public service announcements for NOAA Weather Radio. He served as the voice of The Roadhouse, the classic country Sirius Satellite Radio channel. Sterban was a minority owner of the Nashville Sounds minor league baseball team from 1978 to 2008, along with entrepreneur Larry Schmittou and other country music stars, such as Conway Twitty, Larry Gatlin, and Cal Smith.

References

1943 births
American basses
American country singer-songwriters
Collingswood High School alumni
Living people
Musicians from Camden, New Jersey
People from Collingswood, New Jersey
Singer-songwriters from New Jersey
The College of New Jersey alumni
The Oak Ridge Boys members
Country musicians from New Jersey
American male singer-songwriters